99P/Kowal, also known as Kowal 1, is a periodic comet in the Solar System that orbits out by Jupiter and has a 15 year orbital period. It has been observed regularly since 2019. It came to perihelion in April 2022 and will again in May 2037.

References 
 

 99P at Gary W. Kronk's Cometography

External links 
 99P/Kowal 1 – Seiichi Yoshida @ aerith.net

Periodic comets
0099
Discoveries by Charles T. Kowal
19770424